Roverbella is a comune (municipality) in the Province of Mantua in the Italian region Lombardy, located about  east of Milan and about  north of Mantua.

Roverbella borders the following municipalities: Castelbelforte, Marmirolo, Mozzecane, Nogarole Rocca, Porto Mantovano, San Giorgio di Mantova, Trevenzuolo, Valeggio sul Mincio.

References

Cities and towns in Lombardy